Josip Stadler (24 January 1843 – 8 December 1918) was a Roman Catholic priest, the first Archbishop of Vrhbosna, the founder of the religious order of the Servants of the Infant Jesus, and one of the main instigators of 1914 anti-Serb riots in Sarajevo.

Early life and education

Stadler was born in Slavonski Brod in the Habsburg monarchy (present-day Croatia). His parents, Đuro and Marija (née Balošić) were hatmakers. His father's ancestors were originally christened Jews from Upper Austria.

Early in life, he lost both parents. He was taken care of by the Oršić family. He started his education in Slavonski Brod, and continued it, under the patronage of cardinal Juraj Haulik, in Požega and Zagreb where he attended gymnasium. In Rome he attended the Pontifical Gregorian University where he attained a doctorate in philosophy and theology.

Career
Stadler was ordained a priest in Rome on June 6, 1868, after which he returned to Zagreb where he worked as a professor at a seminary and later a university professor at the Catholic Faculty of Theology of the University of Zagreb.

In 1881, the Catholic Church hierarchy in Bosnia and Herzegovina was reinstated after nearly seven centuries, when the last bishop of Bosnia was evicted by Bosnian ban Matej Ninoslav and left Bosnia for Đakovo. Pope Leo XIII named Stadler as the first archbishop of Vrhbosna in Sarajevo. Under his direction, the Cathedral of Jesus' Heart was built, along with the seminary and church of Sts. Cyril and Methodius. In Travnik he helped build the gymnasium and seminary, as well as many churches and women's seminaries throughout the country.

Stadler founded the women's order of the Servants of the Infant Jesus with the intention of helping impoverished and abandoned children and others. He sent a plea to Vienna, to Franziska Lechner to send nuns to Sarajevo. He formed the orphanages Betlehem and Egipat for children and a home for the elderly.

Role in anti-Serb pogrom in Sarajevo in 1914 
Right after the assassination of Archduke Franz Ferdinand of Austria, mobs of Croats and Bosnian Muslims started anti-serb riots in Sarajevo, leading to divisions unprecedented in the city's history. Later that night, an agreement was reached between the provincial government of Bosnia and Herzegovina led by Oskar Potiorek, Sarajevo city police and Štadler with his assistant Ivan Šarić to eradicate the "subversive elements of this land." 

The city government issued a proclamation and invited population of Sarajevo to "fulfill their holy duty and clean their city of the shame through eradication of the subversive elements." It was printed on the posters which were distributed and displayed over the city during that night and tomorrow early morning, which signaled the continuation of the pogrom. Two Serbs were killed on the first day of the demonstrations, and many were attacked, while numerous houses, shops and institutions owned by Serbs were razed or pillaged.

Death
Stadler died in Sarajevo on the feast day of the Assumption of Mary in his 75th year. He was succeeded by archbishop Ivan Šarić. Stadler was buried in Sarajevo Cathedral.

Canonization
During Pope John Paul II's visit to Bosnia and Herzegovina on 12 April 1997 the pope prayed at Stadler's grave. The process for Stadler's canonization began in Sarajevo on 20 June 2002.

Works
Following is a partial list of works authored by archbishop Stadler:
 Logika, Zagreb, 1871
 Poslovice: pučka mudrost, Danica for the year 1873, Zagreb, 1872
 Theologia fundamentalis: tractatus de vera religione, de vera Christi Ecclesia et de Romano Pontifice complectens, Zagreb, 1880
 Theologia fundamentalis: tractatus de traditione, Scriptura et analysi fidei complectens, Sarajevo, 1884
 Filosofija u 6 svezaka [Philosophy in 6 volumes]
 I. Logika, dio prvi: Dijalektika [Logic, Part One: Dialectics], 1904
 II. Logika, dio drugi: Kritika ili noetika [Logic, Part Two: Criticism or Noetics], 1905
 III. Opća metafisika ili ontologija [General Metaphysics or Ontology], 1907
 IV. Kosmologija [Cosmology], 1909
 V. Psihologija [Psychology], 1910
 VI. Naravno bogoslovlje [Natural Theology], 1915

See also
 Anti-Serb riots in Sarajevo
 Antun Mahnić
 Ivan Merz

References

1843 births
1918 deaths
Croats of Bosnia and Herzegovina
Croatian Roman Catholic archbishops
19th-century Roman Catholic archbishops in Croatia
20th-century Roman Catholic archbishops in Croatia
Bishops appointed by Pope Leo XIII
Roman Catholic activists
Archbishops of Vrhbosna
Danube-Swabian people
Anti-Serbian sentiment
Anti-Eastern Orthodoxy in Catholicism
Persecution of Eastern Orthodox Christians